Archocelis is a genus of worms belonging to the family Otocelididae.

Location 
Archocelis are located in Denmark.

Species 
Archocelis macrorhabdites 
Archocelis macrorhabditis

References

Acoelomorphs